James Moody may refer to:

Law
 James S. Moody Jr. (born 1947), American judge
 James Maxwell Moody (born 1940), U.S. federal judge
 James M. Moody Jr. (born 1964), U.S. federal judge nominee, son of James Maxwell Moody
 James Tyne Moody (born 1938), U.S. federal judge

Music
 James Moody (composer) (1907–1995), composer for the harmonica
 James Moody (saxophonist) (1925–2010), jazz saxophone and flute player
 James Moody (album), 1959

Politics
 James Budd Moody (1790–1828), merchant, shipping agent and political figure in Nova Scotia
 James Moody (loyalist) (died 1809), loyalist volunteer and Nova Scotia politician from New Jersey
 James M. Moody (1858–1901), U.S. representative
 Jim Moody (1935–2019), politician

Other
 James Moody (loyalist) (c. 1744–1809),  loyalist volunteer during the American Revolution
 James Chin Moody (born 1976), general manager of International Development at CSIRO
 James Leith Moody (1816–1896), British priest
 James Paul Moody (1887–1912), officer on the RMS Titanic
 Jim Moody (actor) (born 1949), television and film character actor
 Jimmy Moody (1941–1993), British gangster

See also
 James Mudie (1779–1852), Australian settler, marine and author